William Marland (March 11, 1839 – April 17, 1905) was an officer in the United States Army and a Medal of Honor recipient for his role in the American Civil War.

He was a companion of the Massachusetts Commandery of the Military Order of the Loyal Legion of the United States.

Medal of Honor citation
Rank and organization: First Lieutenant, 2d Independent Battery, Massachusetts Light Artillery. Place and date: At Grand Coteau, La., November 3, 1863. Entered service at:------. Born: March 11, 1839, Andover, Mass. Date of issue: February 16, 1897.

Citation:

After having been surrounded by the enemy's cavalry, his support having surrendered, he ordered a charge and saved the section of the battery that was under his command.

See also

 List of American Civil War Medal of Honor recipients: M–P

Notes

References

External links
 

This article includes text in the public domain from the U.S. Government.

1839 births
1905 deaths
United States Army Medal of Honor recipients
People from Andover, Massachusetts
American Civil War recipients of the Medal of Honor